Lucretia is a legendary figure in the history of the Roman Republic.

Lucretia may also refer to:

Paintings
 Lucretia (Artemisia Gentileschi, Los Angeles), Getty Museum
 Lucretia (Artemisia Gentileschi, Milan), private collection
 Lucretia (Artemisia Gentileschi, Potsdam), Neues Palais
 Lucretia (Casali), c. 1750
 Lucretia (Parmigianino), 1540
 Lucretia (Raphael), 1500s
 Lucretia (Rembrandt, 1666)
 Lucretia (Veronese), c. 1585

Other uses
 281 Lucretia, an 11km diameter asteroid in the Main Belt
 Lucretia (Spartacus), a character from the television series Spartacus
 Lucretia My Reflection, a song by The Sisters of Mercy, taken from the 1987 album Floodland
 Lucretia gens, a prominent family of the Roman Republic
 Lucretia the Tumbler, a court jester in the court of Mary I of England
 Lucretia, West Virginia, a community in the United States

People with the given name
 Lucretia Longshore Blankenburg (1845–1937), American suffragist, reformer
 Lucretia Maria Davidson (1808–1825), American poet
 Lucretia Edwards (1916–2005), environmental activist and preservationist
 Lucretia Garfield (1832–1918), wife of United States President James A. Garfield
 Lucretia Peabody Hale (1820–1900), American author
 Lucretia Mott (1793–1880), American Quaker minister, abolitionist, social reformer and proponent of women's rights

See also
 Tropical Storm Lucretia (1950)
 
 Lucrezia (disambiguation), including Lucrecia
 Lucretius (c. 99 BC–c. 55 BC), Roman poet and philosopher

English-language feminine given names
Latin feminine given names